Samuel Gaillard (1839–1879) was an American businessman and state legislator in South Carolina. He represented Charleston County in the state senate from 1870 to 1877 when he resigned after Democrats regained control of South Carolina and engaged in a purge of Republicans.

A Republican, he served in the state militia and chaired the board of the state orphan asylum. He helped organize a business for African Americans to colonize Liberia. He died in Monrovia a year after moving there.

Opposing Martin R. Delany's call for African Americans to represent African American voters, he stated, "Prudence would dictate as a motto 'The best man' be he as black as it is possible to be, or as white as a lily, if he will carry out the principles of Republicanism."

He was elected to fill the seat vacated by the death of William H. Mishaw. R. H. Cain protested his being seated (holding office) in the state senate.

He was part of the 1872 "Bolting Movement". He was one of many Republicans purged out of office after Democrats regained control of all branches of state government in South Carolina in 1877.

References

1839 births
1879 deaths
Date of birth unknown
Date of death unknown
Republican Party South Carolina state senators
19th-century American politicians
People from Charleston County, South Carolina
Place of birth unknown
Politicians from Monrovia